Albert Edward Mackay Rowland (26 October 1885 – 23 July 1918) was a New Zealand athlete who competed in walking events. He competed for Australasia in two walking events at the 1908 Summer Olympics in London.

Early life and family
Born in Christchurch on 26 October 1885, Rowland was the son of Edward Anthony Rowland and Anne Rowland (née Macdonald). He married Agnes Ludlow "Jo" Fraser on 28 October 1911 at Holy Trinity Church in the Christchurch suburb of Avonside, and they went on to have one daughter.

Athletics
A race walker, Rowland won both the 1-mile and 3-miles track walk titles at the New Zealand national athletics championships in 1907.

He represented Australasia at the 1908 Olympic Games in London. He finished fifth in the final of the 3500 metres walk behind teammate, and fellow New Zealander, Harry Kerr, who won the bronze medal. He also competed in the 10-miles walk, finishing fifth in his heat and not progressing to the final.

World War I
Rowland was working on his own account as an optician in Wellington when he enlisted in the New Zealand Expeditionary Force in July 1916. He travelled to Britain with the 21st Reinforcements on the Waitemata, arriving in Plymouth on 27 March 1917. On the voyage, Rowland was one of the editors of the onboard magazine, the Waitemata Wobbler. He was commissioned as a second lieutenant in the New Zealand Rifle Brigade on 30 April 1918, and was attached to the New Zealand Cyclist Battalion when he was killed in the Second Battle of the Marne on 23 July 1918. He was buried in the Marfaux British Cemetery.

See also
 List of Olympians killed in World War I

References

1885 births
1918 deaths
Athletes from Christchurch
New Zealand male racewalkers
Athletes (track and field) at the 1908 Summer Olympics
Olympic athletes of Australasia
New Zealand Army officers
New Zealand military personnel killed in World War I